Paudie Prendergast (born 26 September 1960 in Lismore, County Waterford) is an Irish former hurler who played for the Ballyduff Upper club and at senior level for the Waterford county team.

Prendergast played at midfield. The closest he came to inter-county silverware was in 1989 when Waterford finished runner-up to Tipperary in the Munster Senior Hurling Championship. His club Ballyduff Upper, associated with the village of Ballyduff, County Waterford, and he won two Waterford Senior Hurling Championships in 1982 and 1987.  After retiring from senior club hurling in the early 2000s, Prendergast continued to play for a number of years at junior level.

Honours
 Waterford Senior Hurling Championship winner: 1982 and 1987
 Munster Senior Hurling Championship runners-up: 1989

References

1960 births
Living people
Ballyduff Upper hurlers
Waterford inter-county hurlers